Niklaus Leodegar Franz Ignaz von Bachmann (Näfels, 27 March 1740 – Näfels, 11 February 1831) was a Swiss general who fought in the Napoleonic Wars.

Family and early life 
Bachmann was born in Näfels to an aristocratic family of long-standing military traditions. Among his ancestors were Kaspar von Gallati (1535–1619) and Kaspar Freuler (1595–1651), first and fourth colonels of the Regiment of Swiss Guards of the King of France. He was the younger son of Maréchal de Camp Karl Leonhard von Bachmann and Maria Elisabetha Keller. His older brother was major and Maréchal de Camp Karl Josef von Bachmann, commanding officer of the Swiss Guard during the Insurrection of 10 August 1792. His sister Maria Dorothea married Freiherr Franz Josef Muller von Friedberg, Prime Minister of the Prince-abbot of St. Gall, and was the  mother of Karl Muller von Friedberg, Swiss politician, founder and first Landamman of the Canton of St. Gallen.  

He studied at the Jesuits' College in Feldkirch and at the Nazaren Institute in Rome before joining the Swiss regiments in the French Army in 1756.

Military career in France
Bachmann entered the French Army in 1756. He was promoted to ensign in 1758, to captain in the Regiment Widmer in 1759, and to major in the Regiment Boccard in 1768. He became a lieutenant-colonel in 1773 and was made a Knight of the Order of Saint Louis in 1778. Promoted to colonel in 1779, Bachmann was in charge of the training of troops from Brittany sent to fight in North America in the American War of Independence, and introduced the Prussian drill in the French Army.

In 1789 he was appointed to the Supreme War Council. The French Revolution brought with it the abolition of the Swiss Guard Regiment and the end of the Capitulations between the French Monarchy and the Swiss Confederation. Bachmann's brother, Karl Josef, was sentenced to death for his part in the defense of King Louis XVI on 10 August 1792 and was guillotined in September of the same year.

Military career in Sardinia and Austria
Bachmann, outraged by the fall of the Monarchy and the deaths of his brother and the King, left France and moved back to Switzerland. Here he recruited his own regiment and in 1793 entered the service of Victor Amadeus III, King of Sardinia, who was bolstering his army in fear of a French attack. Bitter enemy of the revolutionaries (whom he called "the Regicides"), he fought successfully in the area of the Valley of Aosta and was promoted to lieutenant general in 1794, made a Knight of the Order of Saints Maurice and Lazarus and a Count of the Kingdom of Sardinia. After the defeat of Sardinia at the hands of Napoleon, he was forced to return to Switzerland. But, as soon as the Second Coalition arose against revolutionary France, he entered Austro-British service and commanded the Swiss troops fighting for the Coalition.

Stecklikrieg
In 1802, the Swiss Diet in Schwyz made him Commander in chief of the Swiss federal army, which opposed the Army of the Helvetic Republic. In the brief Stecklikrieg he defeated the Helvetic Army and was about to cause the collapse of the Helvetic Republic when Napoleon intervened. General Rapp, sent by Napoleon to "pacify" Switzerland, was angrily told by General Bachmann that had he arrived only 24 hours later he would have found Switzerland fully pacified. Mistrusted by Napoleon, without any sympathy for the new governments of either Switzerland or France Bachmann went into retirement at the age of 63.

War of the Seventh Coalition
In 1815, after Napoleon's return to power in the Hundred Days, the Swiss Federal Diet called him back into service and made him again commander-in-chief of the Federal Army. He commanded the Swiss Army that invaded France in 1815. Again his troops used the white cross on a red field as symbol.

After the War he received the Grand Cross of the Order of Saint Louis (France), of the Order of Leopold (Austria) and of the Order of Saints Maurice and Lazarus (Sardinia). The Swiss Diet, which did not have any Orders, gave him a ceremonial sabre with a golden hilt. Louis XVIII offered him the position of inspector general of all the Swiss regiments in France, but he declined the offer due to his age.
In 1819 he attended, as a guest of honour, the inauguration in Lucerne of the Lion Monument by Bertel Thorvaldsen, where his brother's name is engraved. He died in 1831 in his house at the age of almost 91 years.

References

1740 births
1831 deaths
Swiss mercenaries
Swiss military personnel of the Napoleonic Wars
People from the canton of Glarus
Knights of the Order of Saint Louis
Swiss generals
Niklaus Franz